Kim Gwi-jin (born 5 October 1945) is a South Korean speed skater. She competed at the 1964 Winter Olympics and the 1968 Winter Olympics.

References

1945 births
Living people
South Korean female speed skaters
Olympic speed skaters of South Korea
Speed skaters at the 1964 Winter Olympics
Speed skaters at the 1968 Winter Olympics
Speed skaters from Seoul
20th-century South Korean women